Idealism may be:
The philosophical notion of idealism
Idealism (ethics)
Dialectical idealism
Magical idealism in works of Novalis
Idealism (arts)
Idealism in international relations theory
Idealism (Christian eschatology)
Idealism (album), the debut album by Digitalism 
Idealist (film), a 1976 film
IdeaList (software), database software for Windows and Macintosh
Idealism (Turkey)

See also

Ideal (disambiguation)
Realism (disambiguation)